Bathurst may refer to:

Places and jurisdictions

Australia 
 Bathurst, New South Wales, Australia and the following things associated with the city
 Bathurst Region, the local government area for the Bathurst urban area and rural surrounds
 Roman Catholic Diocese of Bathurst in Australia
 Anglican Diocese of Bathurst
 Electoral district of Bathurst, NSW state Legislative Assembly
 Bathurst railway station, New South Wales
 Bathurst County
 Lake Bathurst (New South Wales)
 Bathurst Harbour, Tasmania
 Bathurst Island (Northern Territory)
 Bathurst Lighthouse, on Rottnest Island
 Bathurst Street, Hobart, in Hobart
 Bathurst Street, Sydney, in Sydney

Canada

New Brunswick
 Bathurst, New Brunswick
 Bathurst Parish, New Brunswick
 Bathurst (electoral district)
 Roman Catholic Diocese of Bathurst in Canada

Northwest Territories
 Cape Bathurst, a peninsula in Northwest Territories

Nunavut
 Bathurst Inlet, a body of water in Nunavut
 Bathurst Inlet, Nunavut, a township

Ontario
Toronto
 Bathurst Street (Toronto), in Toronto
 Bathurst Manor, a neighborhood in Toronto
 Bathurst station (Toronto), a subway station in Toronto
 Bathurst Street Bridge, a bridge in Toronto, renamed the Sir Isaac Brock Bridge in 2007

Tay Valley
 Bathurst, Ontario, a former township now part of the township of Tay Valley
 Bathurst Station, Ontario, a community within the township of Tay Valley

Elsewhere 
 Banjul, The Gambia, formerly known as Bathurst
 Bathurst, Eastern Cape, South Africa
 A market garden in the hamlet Heathrow, U.K.; see Heathrow timeline

Ships
 Bathurst-class corvette, a class of sixty ships used during and after World War II
 HMS Bathurst (1821); see Phillip Parker King
 HMAS Bathurst, two specific ships in the Royal Australian Navy:
 HMAS Bathurst (J158), lead ship of the Bathurst class corvettes, serving from 1940 until 1946
 HMAS Bathurst (ACPB 85), an active Armidale class patrol boat commissioned in 2006

Other uses
 Bathurst (surname)
 Bathurst 1000 motor race for touring cars run in October

See also
 Bathurst Airport (disambiguation)
 Bathurst Island (disambiguation)
 Bathurst station (disambiguation)
 Bathurst Street (disambiguation)